Sankalchand Patel University (SPU) is a private university located in Visnagar, Mehsana district, Gujarat, India. The university was established in 2016 by the Nootan Sarva Vidyalaya Kelvani Mandal through The Gujarat Private Universities (Amendment) Act, 2016 which also established Anant National University, Marwadi University and Plastindia International University.

Constituent institutes
The university's constituent institutes include:
 Sankalchand Patel College of Engineering
 Smt. S. B. Patel Institute of Business Management
 Manish Institute of Management
 Shri C. J. Patel College of Computer Studies
 Smt. S.S. Patel Nootan Science and Commerce College
 Nootan Pharmacy College
 Nootan College of Nursing
 Narsinhbhai Patel Dental College and Hospital
 Nootan College of Physiotherapy
 Swami Sachchidanand Polytechnic College

References

External links

Mehsana district
Universities in Gujarat
Educational institutions established in 2016
2016 establishments in Gujarat
Private universities in India